Sheedy is a surname. Notable people with the surname include:

 Ally Sheedy (born 1962), American screen and stage actress
 Callum Sheedy (born 1995), Wales rugby union player
 Jack Sheedy (Gaelic footballer) (21st century), former Dublin senior football player
 Jack Sheedy (Australian rules footballer) (1926–2023), East Fremantle Football Club player
 Kevin Sheedy (Australian footballer) (born 1947), former coach of AFL club Essendon
 Kevin Sheedy (Irish footballer) (born 1959), Republic of Ireland footballer
 Liam Sheedy (born 1969), Irish hurling manager and former player